Richard Peabody is a poet, editor, and publisher, based in Washington, D.C.

Biography
A native of the Washington DC metropolitan region, Peabody received a B.A. in English from the University of Maryland in 1973 and a M.A. in Literature from American University in 1975.

Peabody is perhaps best known as one of the founding editors for Gargoyle Magazine, which he largely funded with his own income.  
He is also editor for the anthology series Mondo and runs a small press called Paycock Press. 
Paycock Press was originally established in 1976 to publish Gargoyle Magazine, but it also has released a number of anthologies and works by individual authors.

Peabody's own fiction and poetry is often set in Washington, D.C. and the surrounding region.  
It is often noted for strong influences from the Beat Generation and experimental authors of the 1960s such as Ken Kesey.

During his writing and publishing career, Peabody has taught fiction writing for the University of Maryland, University of Virginia, Johns Hopkins University, and the Writer's Center.  
In addition, Peabody has taught creative writing courses and workshops at St. John's College, Writer's Center, Georgetown University, and University of Maryland.

He currently resides in Arlington, Virginia, with his wife and two daughters.

Selected publications 
 as Editor
 Abundant Grace: More Fiction by D.C. Area Women. (Cover art by Lisa Montag Brotman). Paycock Press, 2016. 
 Defying Gravity: Fiction by D.C. Area Women. (Cover art by Sheep Jones). Paycock Press, 2014. 
 Amazing Graces: Yet Another Collection of Fiction by Washington Area Women. (Cover art by Sheep Jones). Paycock Press, 2012. 
 Gravity Dancers: Even More Fiction by Washington Area Women. (Cover art by Sheep Jones). Paycock Press, 2009. 
 Electric Grace: Still More Fiction by Washington Area Women. (Cover art by Jody Mussoff). Paycock Press, 2007. 
 Enhanced Gravity: More Fiction by Washington Area Women. (Cover art by Jody Mussoff). Paycock Press, 2006. 
 Sex and Chocolate: Tasty Morsels for the Mind and Body. (Co-edited with Lucinda Ebersole). Paycock Press, 2006.  
 Alice Redux: New Stories of Alice, Lewis and Wonderland. Paycock Press, 2006.  
 
 Grace and Gravity: Fiction by Washington Area Women. (Cover art by Jody Mussoff). Paycock Press, 2004.  
 A Different Beat: Writings by Women of the Beat Generation. Serpent's Tail, 1997.
 Mondo James Dean. (Co-edited with Lucinda Ebersole). St. Martin's Press, 1996.
 Coming to Terms: A Literary Response to Abortion. (Co-edited with Lucinda Ebersole). The New Press, 1995. 
 Mondo Marilyn. (Co-edited with Lucinda Ebersole). St. Martin's Press, 1995. 
 Mondo Elvis. (Co-edited with Lucinda Ebersole). St. Martin's Press, 1994. 
 
 Mavericks: Nine Independent Publishers. Paycock Press, 1983.  
 DC Magazines: A Literary Retrospective. Paycock Press, 1982.

 as Author
 The Richard Peabody Reader, Alan Squire Publishing, 2015, 
 Speed Enforced by Aircraft, Broadkill River Press, 2012, 
 Blue Suburban Skies,  Main Street Rag, 2012,  
 Last of the Red Hot Magnetos. Paycock Press, 2004.  
 Sugar Mountain. Argonne Hotel Press, 2000.  
 Open Joints on Bridge. Argonne Hotel Press, 1999.  
 Mood Vertigo. Argonne Hotel Press, 1999.  
 Paraffin Days: A Collection of Stories. Cumberland Press, 1995.  
 Buoyancy and Other Myths. Gut Punch Press, 1995.  
 Sad Fashions. Gut Punch Press, 1990.  
 I'm in Love With The Morton Salt Girl. Paycock Press, 1979.

References

External links

 Gargoyle Magazine and Paycock Press
 Author's bio in Sugar Mountain.  Argonne Hotel Press, 2000.

Year of birth missing (living people)
Living people
American male poets
University of Maryland, College Park alumni
American University alumni
American short story writers
American magazine editors
American publishers (people)
Journalists from Washington, D.C.
Poets from Virginia
People from Arlington County, Virginia
Poets from Washington, D.C.
American male short story writers
Journalists from Virginia
American male non-fiction writers